Li Meiju (born October 3, 1981 in Hebei) is a Chinese shot putter.

Her personal best put is 19.19 metres, achieved in the qualifying round of the 2008 Olympic Games in Beijing.

Competition record

References

1981 births
Living people
Athletes from Hebei
Chinese female shot putters
Olympic athletes of China
Athletes (track and field) at the 2004 Summer Olympics
Athletes (track and field) at the 2008 Summer Olympics
Asian Games gold medalists for China
Asian Games silver medalists for China
Asian Games medalists in athletics (track and field)
Athletes (track and field) at the 2002 Asian Games
Athletes (track and field) at the 2006 Asian Games
Universiade medalists in athletics (track and field)
Medalists at the 2002 Asian Games
Medalists at the 2006 Asian Games
Universiade silver medalists for China
Medalists at the 2005 Summer Universiade
21st-century Chinese women